Live in Cottbus '98 is a DVD by American band Death. It was recorded in Cottbus, Germany in 1998 and released on November 11, 2005, through Nuclear Blast. The DVD was released, along with the rerelease of The Sound of Perseverance, in order to commemorate the fourth anniversary of Chuck Schuldiner's death.

The album was recorded directly through the soundboard and as a result, is very rough. The DVD also lacked a proper track listing.

Track listing

Personnel 
 Chuck Schuldiner – vocals, guitar
 Richard Christy – drums
 Scott Clendenin – bass
 Shannon Hamm – guitar

Death (metal band) albums
2005 live albums
Nuclear Blast live albums
2005 video albums
Live video albums
Nuclear Blast video albums
Live albums published posthumously